Irène Waldspurger is a French mathematician and a researcher at the Research Centre in Mathematics of Decision (CEREMADE) where her research focuses on algorithm to solve phase problems, a class of problem relevant for a large number of imaging techniques used in science and medicine. She is also a professor at Paris Sciences et Lettres University.

Education and career 
Waldspurger competed for France in the 2006 International Mathematical Olympiad, winning a bronze medal.

Waldspurger was a student of the prestigious Ecole Normale Superieure, in Paris, France, where she was ranked first at the entrance exam in 2006. She pursued her doctoral research at École Normale Supérieure, working on phase retrieval techniques using wavelet transforms under the supervision of Stephane Mallat, which she completed in 2015. She then joined the Massachusetts Institute of Technology for a postdoctoral fellowship, before returning to France in 2017 to join the French National Centre for Scientific Research.

Recognition 
In 2020, Waldspurger was one of the Peccot Lecturers and Peccot Prize winners of the College de France, and won the CNRS Bronze Medal.

References

External links
Irène Waldspurger

French mathematicians
French National Centre for Scientific Research awards
École Normale Supérieure alumni
Living people
Year of birth missing (living people)